The Interior Exploration using Seismic Investigations, Geodesy and Heat Transport (InSight) mission was a robotic lander designed to study the deep interior of the planet Mars. It was manufactured by Lockheed Martin Space, was managed by NASA's Jet Propulsion Laboratory (JPL), and two of its three scientific instruments were built by European agencies. The mission launched on 5 May 2018 at 11:05:01 UTC aboard an Atlas V-401 launch vehicle and successfully landed at Elysium Planitia on Mars on 26 November 2018 at 19:52:59 UTC. InSight was active on Mars for  sols ( days).

InSight objectives were to place a seismometer, called Seismic Experiment for Interior Structure (SEIS), on the surface of Mars to measure seismic activity and provide accurate 3D models of the planet's interior; and measure internal heat transfer using a heat probe called HP3 to study Mars' early geological evolution. This intended to a new understanding of how the Solar System's terrestrial planets – Mercury, Venus, Earth, Mars – and Earth's Moon formed and evolve.

The lander was originally planned for launch in March 2016. An instrument problem delayed the launch beyond the 2016 launch window. NASA officials rescheduled the InSight launch to May 2018 and during the wait the instrument was repaired. This increased the total cost from US$675 million to US$830 million. NASA stated that due to excessive dust on its solar panels preventing it from recharging, they plan to put InSight in low-power mode for detecting seismic events in July 2022 and continue monitoring the lander through the operational period ending in December 2022. On 20 December 2022, NASA announced that the InSight lander had lost communications with Earth on 15 December 2022, with the end of the mission being declared on 21 December 2022.

History

Discovery Program selection 

InSight was initially known as GEMS (Geophysical Monitoring Station), but its name was changed in early 2012 following a request by NASA.  Out of 28 proposals from 2010, it was one of the three Discovery Program finalists receiving $3 million in May 2011 to develop a detailed concept study. In August 2012, InSight was selected for development and launch. Managed by NASA's Jet Propulsion Laboratory (JPL) with participation from scientists from several countries, the mission was cost-capped at US$425 million, not including launch vehicle funding.

By reusing the landing system designed for the Mars Phoenix lander, which successfully landed on Mars in 2008, mission costs and risks were reduced.

Schedule issues 
Lockheed Martin began construction of the lander on 19 May 2014, with general testing starting on 27 May 2015.

A persistent vacuum leak in the CNES-supplied seismometer known as the Seismic Experiment for Interior Structure (SEIS) led NASA to postpone the planned launch in March 2016 to May 2018. When InSight was delayed, the rest of the spacecraft was returned to Lockheed Martin's factory in Colorado for storage, and the Atlas V launch vehicle intended to launch the spacecraft was reassigned to the WorldView-4 mission.

On 9 March 2016, NASA officials announced that InSight would be delayed until the 2018 launch window at an estimated cost of US$150 million. The spacecraft was rescheduled to launch on 5 May 2018 for a Mars landing on 26 November 2018 at 20:00 UTC. The flight plan remained unchanged with launch using an Atlas V launch vehicle from Vandenberg Space Force Base in California. NASA's Jet Propulsion Laboratory was tasked with redesigning and building a new vacuum enclosure for the SEIS instrument, while CNES conducted instrument integration and testing.

On 22 November 2017, InSight completed testing in a thermal vacuum, also known as TVAC testing, where the spacecraft is put in simulated space conditions with reduced pressure and various thermal loads. On 23 January 2018, after a long storage, its solar panels were once again deployed and tested, and a second silicon chip containing 1.6 million names from the public was added to the lander.

Effects of Martian dust and end of operations 
The InSight lander, powered by solar panels and batteries, relies on periodic wind gusts called "cleaning events" to reduce dust accumulation on the panels.  Elysium Planitia, the landing site of InSight, has experienced fewer cleaning events than needed to keep the science operations powered.  In February 2021, at the start of the Martian winter, InSight's solar cells were producing 27% of capacity due to a thick covering of dust on the panels. At that time NASA began the process of putting the lander into hibernation mode, shutting down data-gathering instruments on a schedule to conserve enough power to keep the lander electronics warm through the Martian winter.  NASA had hoped that weather conditions would improve and allow InSight to store enough energy to come out of hibernation in July 2021.
In May 2021, some generation capacity was restored by using the arm to position sand so it could blow onto the solar panels and scour them clean.

NASA determined in May 2022 that there was too much dust on the panels to continue the mission. InSight was generating only one-tenth of the power from the sunlight than it did upon arrival. They put the lander in a low-power mode in July 2022 to continue monitoring for seismic events. NASA continued to monitor InSight until the end of 2022, when the spacecraft missed two consecutive communication attempts.

Science background

Seismic vibrations 

Both Viking spacecraft carried seismometers mounted on their landers, and in 1976 it picked up vibrations from various operations of the lander and from the wind. However, the Viking 1 lander's seismometer did not deploy properly and did not unlock; the locked seismometer could not operate.

The Viking 2 seismometer unlocked; it operated and returned data to Earth. One problem was accounting for other data. On Sol 80, the Viking 2 seismometer detected an event. No wind data were recorded at the same time, so it was not possible to determine whether the data indicated a seismic event or wind gust. Other lacking data would have been useful to rule out other sources of vibrations. Two other problems were the location of the lander and that a certain level of wind on Mars caused a loss of sensitivity for the Viking 2 seismometer. To overcome these and other issues, InSight had many other sensors, was placed directly on the surface, and also had a windshield.

The Viking 2 seismometer did detect vibrations from Mars winds complementing the meteorology results. There was the aforementioned candidate for a possible marsquake, but it was not particularly definitive. The wind data did prove useful in its own right, and despite the limitations of the data, widespread and large marsquakes were not detected.

Seismometers were also left on the Moon, starting with Apollo 11 in 1969, and also by Apollo 12, 14, 15 and 16 missions and provided many insights into lunar seismology, including the discovery of moonquakes. The Apollo seismic network, which was operated until 1977, detected at least 28 moonquakes up to 5.5 on the Richter scale.

One of the aspects of the InSight mission was to compare the Earth, Moon, and Mars seismic data.

On 4 May 2022, a large marsquake, estimated at magnitude 5, was detected by the seismometer on the InSight lander.

Planetary precession 
Radio Doppler measurements were taken with Viking and twenty years later with Mars Pathfinder, and in each case the axis of rotation of Mars was estimated. By combining this data, the core size was constrained, because the change in axis of rotation over 20 years allowed a precession rate and from that the planet's moment of inertia to be estimated. InSight measurements of crust thickness, mantle viscosity, core radius and density, and seismic activity were planned to result in a three- to tenfold increase in accuracy compared to previous data.

Objectives 
The InSight mission placed a single stationary lander on Mars to study its deep interior and address a fundamental issue of planetary and Solar System science: understanding the processes that shaped the rocky planets of the inner Solar System (including Earth) more than four billion years ago.

InSight primary objective was to study the earliest evolutionary processes that shaped Mars. By studying the size, thickness, density and overall structure of Mars' core, mantle and crust, as well as the rate at which heat escapes from the planet's interior, InSight will provide a glimpse into the evolutionary processes of all of the rocky planets in the inner Solar System. The rocky inner planets share a common ancestry that begins with accretion. As the body increases in size, its interior heats up and evolves to become a terrestrial planet, containing a core, mantle and crust. Despite this common ancestry, each of the terrestrial planets is later shaped and molded through the poorly understood process of differentiation. InSight mission's goal was to improve the understanding of this process and, by extension, terrestrial evolution, by measuring the planetary building blocks shaped by this differentiation: a terrestrial planet's core, mantle and crust.

The mission will determine if there is any seismic activity, measure the rate of heat flow from the interior, estimate the size of Mars' core and whether the core is liquid or solid. This data would be the first of its kind for Mars. It is also expected that frequent meteor airbursts (10–200 detectable events per year for InSight) will provide additional seismo-acoustic signals to probe the interior of Mars. The mission's secondary objective was to conduct an in-depth study of geophysics, tectonic activity and the effect of meteorite impacts on Mars, which could provide knowledge about such processes on Earth. Measurements of crust thickness, mantle viscosity, core radius and density, and seismic activity should result in a three- to tenfold increase in accuracy compared to current data. This is the first time a robotic lander dug this deep into the martian crust.

In terms of fundamental processes shaping planetary formation, it is thought that Mars contains the most in-depth and accurate historical record, because it is big enough to have undergone the earliest accretion and internal heating processes that shaped the terrestrial planets, but is small enough to have retained signs of those processes. The science phase is expected to last for two years.

Design 

The mission further develops a design based on the 2008 Phoenix Mars lander. Because InSight is powered by solar panels, it landed near the equator to enable maximum power for a projected lifetime of two years (1 Martian year). The mission includes two relay microsatellites called Mars Cube One (MarCO) that launched with InSight but were flying in formation with InSight to Mars.

Three major aspects to the InSight spacecraft are the cruise stage, the entry, descent, and landing system, and the lander.

Overall specifications 

Mass
 Total mass during cruise: 
 Lander: 
 Aeroshell:  Aeroshell Diameter (backshell and heat shield) : 2.64 meters (8.67 ft)
 Cruise stage: 
 Propellant and pressurant: 
 Relay probes flew separately but they weighed  each (there were 2)

Lander specifications 
 Lander mass:  including about 50 kg of science payload.
 Mars weight (0.376 of Earth's): 
 The length of the robotic arm is 
 Tilt of lander at landing on Mars: 4°

Power 

Power is generated by two round solar panels, each  in diameter when unfurled, and consisting of SolAero ZTJ triple-junction solar cells made of InGaP/InGaAs/Ge arranged on Orbital ATK UltraFlex arrays. After touchdown on the Martian surface, the arrays are deployed by opening like a folding fan.
 Rechargeable batteries
 Solar panels yielded 4.6 kilowatt-hours on Sol 1

Payload 

InSight performed three major experiments using SEIS, HP3 and RISE. SEIS is a very sensitive seismometer, measuring vibrations; HP3 involves a burrowing probe to measure the thermal properties of the subsurface. RISE uses the radio communication equipment on the lander and on Earth to measure the overall movement of planet Mars that could reveal the size and density of its core.

 The Seismic Experiment for Interior Structure (SEIS) measured marsquakes and other internal activity on Mars, and the response to meteorite impacts, to better understand the planet's history and structure. SEIS was provided by the French Space Agency (CNES), with the participation of the Institut de Physique du Globe de Paris (IPGP), the Swiss Federal Institute of Technology (ETH), the Max Planck Institute for Solar System Research (MPS), Imperial College, Institut supérieur de l'aéronautique et de l'espace (ISAE) and JPL. The seismometer can also detect sources including atmospheric waves and tidal forces from Mars' moon Phobos. A leak in SEIS in 2016 had forced a two-year mission postponement. The SEIS instrument is supported by meteorological tools including a vector magnetometer provided by UCLA that measures magnetic disturbances, air temperature, wind speed and wind direction sensors based on the Spanish/Finnish Rover Environmental Monitoring Station; and a barometer from JPL.

 The Heat Flow and Physical Properties Package (HP3), provided by the German Aerospace Center (DLR) included a radiometer and a heat flow probe. The tether contains precise temperature sensors every  to measure the temperature profile of the subsurface.
 The Rotation and Interior Structure Experiment (RISE) led by the Jet Propulsion Laboratory (JPL), was a radio science experiment that uses the lander's X band radio to provide precise measurements of planetary rotation to better understand the interior of Mars. X band radio tracking, capable of an accuracy under , builds on previous Viking program and Mars Pathfinder data. The previous data allowed the core size to be estimated, but with more data from InSight, the nutation amplitude can be determined. Once spin axis direction, precession, and nutation amplitudes are better understood, it should be possible to calculate the size and density of the Martian core and mantle. This should increase the understanding of the formation of terrestrial planets (e.g. Earth) and rocky exoplanets.
 Temperature and Winds for InSight (TWINS), fabricated by the Spanish Astrobiology Center, monitors weather at the landing site.
 Laser RetroReflector for InSight (LaRRI) is a corner cube retroreflector provided by the Italian Space Agency and mounted on InSight top deck. It enables passive laser range-finding by orbiters after the lander is retired, and will function as a node in a proposed Mars geophysical network.
 Instrument Deployment Arm (IDA) is a  robotic arm that deployed the SEIS, wind and thermal shield, and HP3 instruments to Mars' surface. It is a 4 DOF motorized manipulator, constructed from carbon-fiber composite tubes. Originally intended for the canceled Mars Surveyor mission, the IDA features a scoop, wax actuated grappling claw, and the IDC camera.
 The Instrument Deployment Camera (IDC) is a color camera based on the Mars Exploration Rover and Mars Science Laboratory navcam design. It is mounted on the Instrument Deployment Arm and images the instruments on the lander's deck and provides stereoscopic views of the terrain surrounding the landing site. It features a 45° field of view and uses a 1024 × 1024 pixel CCD detector. The IDC sensor was originally black and white for best resolution; a program was enacted that tested with a standard Hazcam and, since development deadlines and budgets were met, it was replaced with a color sensor.
 The Instrument Context Camera (ICC) is a color camera based on the MER/MSL Hazcam design. It is mounted below the lander's deck, and with its wide-angle 120° panoramic field of view provides a complementary view of the instrument deployment area. Like the IDC, it uses a 1024 × 1024 pixel CCD detector.

The two relay 6U cubesats were part of the overall InSight program, and were launched at the same time as the lander but they were attached to the centaur upper stage (InSight's second stage in the launch). They were ejected from the stage after launch and coasted to Mars independent of the main InSight cruise stage with the lander.

Twin Lander 
JPL also built a full-scale engineering model, named ForeSight. This was used to practice instrument deployment, trial new ways to deploy the HP3 instrument, and test methods to reduce seismometer noise.
 
With the mission now ended, the testbed is being scrapped and its parts will be offered to other teams like the Mars Sample Retrieval Lander (SRL) for the Mars Sample Return campaign at JPL to be repurposed for their own needs. SRL currently looks to have a similar design, but with different domed-shaped deck and five solar panels instead of two on InSight and ForeSight. Anything that is not needed will go into storage. But there no attempt will be undertaken to restore ForeSight or send it to a Museum.

Journey to Mars

Launch 
On 28 February 2018, InSight was shipped via C-17 cargo aircraft from the Lockheed Martin Space building in Denver to Vandenberg Air Force Base in California in order to be integrated to the launch vehicle. The lander was launched on 5 May 2018 and arrived on Mars at approximately 19:54 UTC on 26 November 2018.

The spacecraft was launched on 5 May 2018 at 11:05 UTC on an Atlas V 401 launch vehicle (AV-078) from Vandenberg Air Force Base Space Launch Complex 3-East. This was the first American interplanetary mission to launch from California.

The launch was managed by NASA's Launch Services Program. InSight was originally scheduled for launch on 4 March 2016 on an Atlas V 401 (4 meter fairing/zero (0) solid rocket boosters/single (1) engine Centaur) from Vandenberg Air Force Base in California, U.S., but was called off in December 2015 due to a vacuum leak on the SEIS instrument. The rescheduled launch window ran from 5 May to 8 June 2018.

Major components of the launch vehicle include:
 Common Core Booster
 This launch did not use additional solid rocket boosters
 Centaur with Relay CubeSats
 InSight in a Payload fairing

The journey to Mars took 6.5 months across  for a touchdown on 26 November. After a successful landing, a three-month-long deployment phase commenced as part of its two-year (a little more than one Martian year) prime mission.

Cruise 

After its launch from Earth on 5 May in 2018, it coasted through interplanetary space for 6.5 months traveling across  for a touchdown on 26 November in that year.

The MarCo probes were ejected from the 2nd stage Centaur booster and traveled to Mars independent of the InSight cruise stage, but they were all launched together.

During the cruise to Mars, the InSight cruise stage made several course adjustments, and the first of these (TCM-1) took place on 22 May 2018. The cruise stage that carries the lander includes solar panels, antenna, star trackers, sun sensor, inertial measurement unit among its technologies. The thrusters are actually on the InSight lander itself, but there are cutouts in the shell so the relevant rockets can vent into space.

The final course correction was 25 November 2018, the day before its touch down. A few hours before making contact with the Martian atmosphere, the cruise stage was jettisoned, on 26 November 2018.

Entry, descent, and landing 
On 26 November 2018, at approximately 19:53 UTC, mission controllers received a signal via the Mars Cube One (MarCO) satellites that the spacecraft had successfully touched down at Elysium Planitia. After landing, the mission took three months to deploy and commission the geophysical science instruments. It  then began its mission of observing Mars, which is planned to last for two years.

There were  three major stages to InSight's landing:
 Entry: after separating from the cruise stage the aeroshell enters the atmosphere and is subject to air and dust in the Martian atmosphere.
 Parachute descent: at a certain speed and altitude a parachute is deployed to slow the lander further.
 Rocket descent: closer to the ground the parachute is ejected and the lander uses rocket engines to slow the lander before touchdown.

Landing sequence:
 25 November 2018, final course correction before EDL.
 26 November 2018, Cruise stage jettisoned before entering the atmosphere.
 Aeroshell is heated to  during descent.
 At  and ~ above the surface, the parachute is deployed.
 Several seconds later, the heat shield is jettisoned from the lander.
 The landing legs extended.
 Landing radar activated.
 Landing rockets turned on.
 Roughly  from the ground constant velocity mode is entered.
 Touchdowneach of the three lander legs have a sensor to detect ground contact.
 Descent rockets are turned off at touchdown.
 Begin surface operations.

The lander's mass is about  but on Mars, which has 0.376 of Earth's gravity, it only weighs the equivalent of a  object on Earth.

On 26 November 2018, InSight successfully touched down in Elysium Planitia.

A few hours after landing, NASA's 2001 Mars Odyssey orbiter relayed signals indicating that InSight solar panels had successfully unfurled and are generating enough electrical power to recharge its batteries daily. Odyssey also relayed a pair of images showing InSight landing site. More images were acquired in stereo pairs to create 3D images, allowing InSight to find the best locations on the surface to place the heat probe and seismometer. Over the next few weeks, InSight checked health indicators and monitor both weather and temperature conditions at the landing site.

Landing site 

As InSight science goals are not related to any particular surface feature of Mars, potential landing sites were chosen on the basis of practicality. Candidate sites needed to be near the equator of Mars to provide sufficient sunlight for the solar panels year round, have a low elevation to allow for sufficient atmospheric braking during EDL, be flat and relatively rock-free to reduce the probability of complications during landing, and have soft enough terrain to allow the heat flow probe to penetrate well into the ground.

An optimal area that meets all these requirements is Elysium Planitia, so all 22 initial potential landing sites were located in this area. The only two other areas on the equator and at low elevation, Isidis Planitia and Valles Marineris, are too rocky. In addition, Valles Marineris has too steep a gradient to allow safe landing.

In September 2013, the initial 22 potential landing sites were narrowed down to four, and the Mars Reconnaissance Orbiter was then used to gain more information on each of the four potential sites before a final decision was made.

In March 2017, scientists from the Jet Propulsion Laboratory announced that the landing site had been selected.

On 26 November 2018, the spacecraft successfully touched down at its landing site, and in early December 2018 InSight lander and EDL components were imaged from space on the surface of Mars. The images provided precise position of the lander: .

Surface operations 
On 26 November 2018, NASA reported that the InSight lander had landed successfully on Mars. The meteorological suite (TWINS) and magnetometer were operational, and the mission took approximately three months to deploy and commission the geophysical science instruments. After landing, the dust was allowed to settle for a few hours, during which time the solar array motors were warmed up and then the solar panels were unfurled. The lander then reported its systems' status, acquired some images, and it powered down to sleep mode for its first night on Mars. On its first sol on Mars it set a new solar power record of 4.6 kilowatt-hours generated for a single Martian day (known as a "sol"). This amount is enough to support operations and deploy the sensors.

On 7 December 2018, InSight recorded the sounds of Martian winds with SEIS, which is able to record vibrations within human hearing range, although rather low (aka subwoofer-type sounds), and these were sent back to Earth. This was the first time the sound of Mars wind was heard after two previous attempts.

On 19 December 2018, the SEIS instrument was deployed onto the surface of Mars next to the lander by its robotic arm, and it was commissioned on 4 February 2019. After the seismometer became fully operational, the heat probe instrument was deployed on 12 February 2019.

In April 2019, NASA reported that the Mars InSight lander detected its first marsquake.

In September 2019, researchers reported that InSight uncovered unexplained magnetic pulses, and magnetic oscillations.

On 24 February 2020, a summary of studies over the past year from InSight was presented which indicated that the planet Mars has active quakes, dust devils and magnetic pulses.

In February 2020, according to new data gathered from NASA's InSight lander, it was found that the Martian magnetic field at the landing site is about 10 times stronger than previously thought, and fluctuates rapidly.

On 12 April 2021, it was reported that Insight went into emergency hibernation because its Solar panels were filled with Martian dust.

On 14 April, the lander began to transmit images after waking from hibernation.

On 3 May 2021, InSight used its robotic arm to trickle sand beside a solar panel. The InSight team wanted to let the sand blow away and touch the solar panels, sticking some dust particles to it, before leaving the solar panel. The sand trickle resulted in a boost in power of 30 watt-hours per sol.

In July 2021 three papers studying Mars' interior structure were published. Seismometer data confirms that the center of Mars is molten. The crust of Mars is thinner than expected and may have two or three sub-layers.

In January 2022, InSight went into safe mode due to a regional dust storm in the area, which caused a reduction in sunlight. During its time in safe mode, all but essential functions were suspended. It left safe mode on 19 January 2022 and resumed normal operations, however all science instruments were left off in the mean time. 

As of May 2022, Insight has recorded 1,313 Marsquakes.

The seismometer (SEIS), radio experiment (RISE) and the weather instruments (TWINS) continue to operate as the lander's Mars surface mission was extended by two years, until end of December 2022.

Heat Flow and Physical Properties Package
On 28 February 2019, the Heat Flow and Physical Properties Package probe (mole) started digging into the surface of Mars. After many attempts, the effort was given up as a failure in January 2021.

In October 2019, the researchers at JPL concluded that the soil on Mars does not provide necessary friction for drilling, causing the mole to bounce around and form a wide pit around itself rather than dig deeper. They attempted a maneuver called  in which they pressed the side of the scoop against the mole location to pin the side of the wall of the hole and increase friction. Pinning was initially successful, but then the mole backed out of its hole after a few weeks, suggesting the soil is accumulating below the mole.

In February 2020, the team reevaluated the risks of pushing the scoop directly against the back cap of the mole, and determined the procedure to be acceptable.

In June 2020, the team reported that the mole was finally underground, and was being evaluated to determine if the mole was able to dig as designed. On 9 July 2020, it was revealed that images taken on 20 June 2020 showed the mole bouncing again, indicating that it did not have sufficient friction to dig deeper. One suggested solution was to partially fill the hole with soil to increase friction.

In early 2021, the InSight team announced they would attempt to detect the arrival of the Mars 2020 mission using InSight's seismometers. Pre-landing modeling of the signals from Mars 2020's entry, descent and landing sequence suggested that the most probable source of any potential signal would be the impact of the spacecraft's cruise mass balance devices with the Martian surface, at speeds of around 4000 m/s. Shortly after successfully landing the Perseverance Rover, NASA announced that its landing went undetected by InSight. This helped demonstrate that Mars has a seismic efficiency of less than 3%.

By August 2020, the operations team had made some progress using the scoop to assist the mole in digging deeper into its hole, by pressing against the back. The scoop was used to fill the hole of the partially submerged mole, burying it fully for the first time. The team hoped the mole can now dig further into the surface on its own, possibly with the additional assistance of the scoop.

On 14 January 2021, the heat probe part of the mission was declared to be over, after the science team had determined that the soil properties at the landing location were incompatible with what the instrument had been designed for. The team attempted many different remedies over nearly two years to get the mole to burrow into the soil, but in the end, the attempts did not succeed. The friction between the soil and the probe was not enough for the mole to hammer itself down through the soil. Another set of attempts to get the probe deeper took place on 9 January 2021. After they proved unsuccessful, the decision was made to leave the probe as is and end attempts to dig deeper. 

The mole did, with all the assisting measures, burrow itself completely underground. The top of the mole is 2 to 3 centimetres below the Martian surface. To be able to produce the intended scientific measurements, the mole needed to have dug itself at least 3 metres deep. Thus the mole was unsuccessful at producing its intended scientific results.

However the mole's operations did produce useful and interesting results about the soil at the InSight site; about conducting excavation, or drilling, on Mars; and about operating the lander's robotic arm through the mole-rescue efforts that used the arm in ways that were unplanned before the mission.

MarCO spacecraft 

The Mars Cube One (MarCO) spacecraft are a pair of 6U CubeSats that piggybacked with the InSight mission to test CubeSat navigation and endurance in deep space, and to help relay real-time communications (with an eight-minute lightspeed delay) during the probe's entry, descent and landing (EDL) phase. The two 6U CubeSats, named MarCO A and B, are identical. They were launched along with InSight, but separated soon after reaching space, and they flew as a pair for redundancy while flanking the lander. They did not enter orbit, but flew past Mars during the EDL phase of the mission and relayed InSight telemetry in real time. The success of the MarCO spacecraft proved the viability of the cubesat platform for deep space missions and helped serve as a technical demonstration for potential future missions of a similar nature. On 5 February 2019, NASA reported that the CubeSats went silent, and are unlikely to be heard from again.
 Mass:  each.
 Dimensions:  each
 Each has a reflectarray high gain antenna
 Miniaturized radio operating in UHF (receive only) and X-band (receive and transmit).
 They carry a miniature wide-angle camera.
Cold gas thrusters for attitude adjustments.
 Star tracker for navigation.

Team and participation 

The InSight science and engineering team includes scientists and engineers from many disciplines, countries and organizations. The science team assigned to InSight includes scientists from institutions in the U.S., France, Germany, Austria, Belgium, Canada, Japan, Switzerland, Spain, Poland and the United Kingdom.

Mars Exploration Rover project scientist W. Bruce Banerdt is the principal investigator for the InSight mission and the lead scientist for the SEIS instrument. Suzanne Smrekar, whose research focuses on the thermal evolution of planets and who has done extensive testing and development on instruments designed to measure the thermal properties and heat flow on other planets, is the lead for InSight HP3 instrument. The Principal Investigator for RISE is William Folkner at JPL. The SEIS Instrument
PI is Philippe Lognonné of IPGP, and the HP3 Instrument PI is Tilman Spohn of the DLR Institute of Planetary Research. The InSight mission team also includes project manager Tom Hoffman and deputy project manager Henry Stone.

Major contributing agencies and institutions are:

 National Aeronautics and Space Administration (NASA)
 Centre National d'Études Spatiales (CNES)
 German Aerospace Center (DLR)
 Italian Space Agency (ASI)
 Jet Propulsion Laboratory (NASA/JPL)
 Lockheed Martin
 Paris Institute of Earth Physics (IPGP)
 Swiss Federal Institute of Technology in Zurich (ETHZ)
 Max Planck Institute for Solar System Research (MPS)
 Imperial College London
 Institut supérieur de l'aéronautique et de l'espace (ISAE-SUPAERO)
 University of Oxford
 Spanish Astrobiology Center (CAB)
 Space Research Centre of Polish Academy of Sciences (CBK)

Name chips 
As part of its public outreach, NASA organized a program where members of the public were able to have their names sent to Mars aboard InSight. Due to its launch delay, two rounds of sign-ups were conducted totaling 2.4 million names: 826,923 names were registered in 2015 and a further 1.6 million names were added in 2017. An electron beam was used to etch letters only  the width of a human hair (1 μm) onto  silicon wafers. The first chip was installed on the lander in November 2015 and the second on 23 January 2018.

Gallery

Context map

See also

References

External links 

 InSight NASA – InSight Mission
 InSight NASA – InSight Raw Images
 InSight NASA – (video/03:31; 18 November 2018; Details)
 InSight NASA – (video/01:38; 26 November 2018; Landing)
 InSight NASA – (video/01:39; 1 December 2018; Wind Sounds)
 InSight NASA – (video/02:48; 19 July 2019; MarsQuakes)
 Mars Weather: Perseverance*Curiosity*InSight

 
Discovery Program
Geology of Mars
Landers (spacecraft)
Missions to Mars
NASA space probes
Spacecraft launched by Atlas rockets
Space probes launched in 2018
Soft landings on Mars
2018 on Mars
Spacecraft decommissioned in 2022